Acinetobacter colistiniresistens is a bacterium from the genus of Acinetobacter which has been isolated from human infections.

References

External links
Type strain of Acinetobacter colistiniresistens at BacDive -  the Bacterial Diversity Metadatabase

Moraxellaceae
Bacteria described in 2017